Valentine Community Schools (ID # 16-0006-000) is a school district headquartered in Valentine, Nebraska.

Rhode Island has an area that would be within the Valentine school district boundary.

Most of the district is in Cherry County, where it includes Valentine, Crookston, and Wood Lake. A small portion of the district is in Brown County.

History
It was established in 2006 as the merger of Valentine City Schools and various rural districts: Ballard Marsh Public School, Boardman Creek Public School, Carver Public School, Crookston Public School, Cutcomb Lake Public School, District 45 Cherry County, District 83 Cherry County, Elsmere Public School, Evergreen Public School, Goose Creek Public School, Hart Lake Public School, Kewanee Public School, Merriman Public School, Simeon Public School, Sparks Public School, Willow Valley Public School, and Wood Lake Public School.

Jamie Isom served as superintendent until her retirement, scheduled for June 30, 2020. In 2019 the school board designated Mike Halley, previously principal of Scottsbluff High School, as Isom's replacement.

Schools
 Valentine schools
 Valentine High School
 Valentine Middle School
 Valentine Elementary School

 Rural schools 
 Cutcomb Lake School - K-8 school
 Simeon School - K-8 school

References

External links
 Valentine Community Schools
School districts in Nebraska
2006 establishments in Nebraska
School districts established in 2006
Education in Cherry County, Nebraska
Brown County, Nebraska